Richard Yeates was an English professional footballer who played as a centre forward.

Career
Yeates signed for Bradford City from "minor football" in August 1924. He made three league appearances for the club, before being released in 1925.

Sources

References

Date of birth missing
Date of death missing
English footballers
Bradford City A.F.C. players
English Football League players
Association football forwards